Gayle Laakmann McDowell (born 1982) is a founder, software engineer, and author. She is known for a career development book, Cracking the Coding Interview.

Education 
McDowell was educated at the Episcopal Academy and the University of Pennsylvania where she was awarded Bachelor of Engineering (BSE) and Master of Engineering (MSE) degrees in Computer Science in 2005.

Career 
After working as a software engineer for Google she joined a small venture capital-funded startup company as the Vice President (VP) of engineering before being awarded a Master of Business Administration (MBA) degree from the Wharton School of the University of Pennsylvania. McDowell subsequently founded her own business, CareerCup.com, which helps people prepare for interviews at tech companies.

First published in 2008, her book Cracking the Coding Interview provides guidance on technical job interviews, and includes solutions to example coding interview questions. She has also published books on Cracking the PM Interview (for product managers: PMs), Cracking the PM career and Cracking the Tech Career. Her work has been covered widely in the press including coverage in The New York Times, The Guardian, 
The Wall Street Journal, USA Today, U.S. News & World Report, and Fast Company.

Awards and honors
McDowell gave the graduation speech at the University of Pennsylvania School of Engineering and Applied Science Masters Commencement in 2016.

References 

1982 births
Living people
American women computer scientists
American computer scientists
American software engineers
21st-century American women